Abdul Baqi Jammoh (1922 – 11 May 2016), also known as Jammu, was a Jordanian politician of Chechen descent. He served in both houses of the Parliament of Jordan, several times as a member of the House of Deputies and as member of the Senate between 1997 and 2001. During his time in the Senate Jammoh was part of the Islamist faction.  Jammoh was member of the cabinet twice. He first served as Minister of state for parliamentary affairs between 1989 and 1991. His second position was that of Minister of state for legal and parliamentary affairs between 1994 and 1995. Jammoh was born in Zarqa.

References

1922 births
2016 deaths
Members of the House of Representatives (Jordan)
Members of the Senate of Jordan
Parliamentary affairs ministers of Jordan
People from Zarqa

Chechen people